Al Cleveland (born Alfred W. Cleveland; March 11, 1930 – August 14, 1996) was an American songwriter for the Motown label. Among his most popular co-compositions are 1967's "I Second That Emotion" and 1969's "Baby, Baby Don't Cry" performed by Smokey Robinson & the Miracles and 1971's "What's Going On"  performed by Marvin Gaye.

Cleveland was born in Pittsburgh, Pennsylvania, United States, to Alfred W. and Dorothy Cleveland.  Al has two sisters, Edna Grate and Mamie Jett, as well as one brother, Robert Cleveland. His sons Alfred D Cleveland and Theodore Mills survive him.
He had a long and distinguished writing career, initially for New York artists on the Scepter/Wand labels such as Dionne Warwick(e) and Tommy Hunt, as well as Gene Pitney before moving to Motown, where he provided songs for Smokey & The Miracles, the Marvelettes, David Ruffin, the Four Tops and Chuck Jackson before hitting the big time with a co-authorship of Marvin Gaye's "What's Goin' On?" and "Save the Children."

In later years, he produced Native American music. He died of heart disease in Las Vegas at the age of 66.

References 

1930 births
1996 deaths
African-American songwriters
Songwriters from Pennsylvania
Motown artists
Musicians from Pittsburgh
20th-century American composers
20th-century African-American musicians